Henry Collins (1844–1904), merchant, was the fifth Mayor of Vancouver, British Columbia, Canada. He served from 1895 to 1896.

References 

 

1844 births
1904 deaths
Mayors of Vancouver
19th-century Canadian politicians